Real Racing Club de Santander, S.A.D., also known as Racing de Santander or simply Racing, is a football club based in Santander, Cantabria, Spain, that currently competes in Segunda División, the second tier of the Spanish league system. It was founded in 1913. It holds home games at Campos de Sport de El Sardinero, with a capacity for 22,222 spectators. It is one of the ten founding clubs of La Liga.

History

Real Racing Club played their first football match on 23 February 1913, losing 1–2 to neighbouring Strong. It was officially founded on 14 June, as Santander Racing Club, appearing in its first tournament during that summer (Luis Redonet Trophy) and being admitted to the Northern Federation on 14 November, eventually merging with Santander Football Club.

In the 1928–29 season, the Spanish League competition began. After a complicated elimination process to determine the tenth and final team for the new First Division, Racing successively beat Valencia, Betis and Sevilla. The club was part of the first goalless game in the league, against Athletic Bilbao.

During the Second Republic, the classifications of Santander varied. In the 1930–31, It achieved the runner-up position in the Spanish League, tied at 22 points with champion Athletic Bilbao, and third-place Real Sociedad. This is the highest finish achieved by the club in all its history, trained by the English Robert Firth and chaired by Fernando Pombo.

They also participated in the International Tournament of Paris, falling in the semifinal to Slavia of Prague (2–1). In the 1930s, under the presidency of the academic José María de Cossío, it had varied positions, from third place in (1933–34) to low table rankings. In seasons 1934–35 and 1935–36, Racing played in the Commonwealth Championship of Castilla-Aragón, in which it finished second in the first season.  Meanwhile, in Cantabria a lesser championship was disputed, not qualifying for the Spanish Cup; Santoña won it. During the 1935–36 season, Racing was the first club in the Spanish league to beat Barcelona and Real Madrid in the four league matches (both home and two as a visitor) in the same season: on 8 December 1935 they won 4–0 against Barcelona in the Campos de Sport de El Sardinero, on 15 December they won in Madrid 2–4, on 8 March 1936 they beat Barcelona 2-3 and on 15 March they defeated Madrid 4–3 at El Sardinero. The only player to score in all matches (one goal in each match, and two in Madrid) was Milucho.

In 1950, the Cantabrians returned to the top flight after a ten-year absence, scoring 99 goals in only 30 games.

During the period of Francoist Spain, the club was renamed Real Santander in 1941, because of the prohibition on non-Spanish names. The name was restored in 1973 as the team returned to the first division one year after nearly relegating, under young manager José María Maguregui. Racing was immediately relegated, And spent the ensuing seasons bouncing between divisions one and two, also being crowned champions in Segunda División B (the new third level, created in 1977) in 1991. Veteran Quique Setién returned to his main club the following year, helping it return to the top flight and scoring in the 1994–95 campaign against FC Barcelona, in a historic 5–0 home win.

Racing was the first Spanish team to wear a sponsor's name on their shirt: German electronics company Teka on 27 December 1981 away to Real Madrid (the corporation then sponsored the opponents early in the following decade).

On 25 March 2000, Racing played its 1,000th game in La Liga.

In the 2000s, Racing only played one season in the second division, winning promotion with Setién as manager. Racing finished the 2005–06 season in the 16th position, just 1 point away from relegation back to Segunda división. The next season was much better, as the club finished 10th, easily retaining its place in the top flight. In 2007–08, under Marcelino García Toral, it finished in sixth position, thus qualifying to the UEFA Cup for the first time ever; additionally the club reached the semifinals of the Copa del Rey twice during this decade, being ousted by eventual runners-up Getafe CF and Atlético Madrid in 2008 and 2010, respectively.

On 22 January 2011, Indian business tycoon Ahsan Ali Syed, founder and chairman of Western Gulf Advisory, an investment company, purchased Racing de Santander, immediately firing coach Miguel Ángel Portugal. The 2011–12 season brought with it three different managers, and the side returned to the second level after one full decade in the top division.

At the end of the following campaign, Racing again finished in 20th position and suffered relegation, also being immersed in a severe institutional and economic crisis. Ending their 22 years in professional league. In spite of that plight, the team was able to reach the quarterfinals in the 2013–14 edition of the domestic cup after ousting top-divisioners Sevilla FC and UD Almería; in the first leg against the latter, club fans stormed the presidential tribune at Estadio El Sardinero and assaulted chairman Ángel Lavín.

On 27 January 2014, Racing's players, citing several months of unpaid wages, announced they would not play their upcoming Cup match unless the club's president and board resigned. Three days later, prior to the second leg against Real Sociedad and after a 1–3 loss in the first match, Racing players gathered at the centre circle immediately after kick-off and refused to play. Referee Jesús Gil Manzano suspended the game after one minute, and the home team was given a loss due to forfeit; as a result of the protest the club was fined and banned from the following edition of the tournament, and on 31 January Lavín was sacked, with former player Juan Antonio Sañudo being appointed his successor by practically all the shareholders.

Racing won their group in the 2013–14 Segunda División B, and won the playoff against Llagostera to be promoted back to the second tier, but they were immediately relegated in the 2014–15 season. They again took first place in the Segunda B section in 2015–16, but were eliminated in the promotion playoffs, failing to score a goal across four matches in the ties lost to Reus and Cádiz.

Racing was promoted back to the second division after four years in the third tier in 2018–19, by winning their regional group and defeating Atlético Baleares in the promotion playoff on the away goals rule, but they were immediately relegated in the 2019–20 season after only winning five games out of 42 and finished in last place. They were unable to bounce back to the second tier immediately, finishing fourth then second in the unique small two-phase group setup during 2020–21 Segunda División B to find themselves remaining at the third level, in the newly formed Primera División RFEF, for the 2021–22 season. Racing confirmed their finish the season in first place and promoted to Segunda División, after two years in third division and fighting with Deportivo La Coruña for the top spot. On 3 June 2022, Racing took the inaugural Primera División RFEF title with a 3-0 win over Andorra.

Rivalries

Racing Santander is one of few Spanish teams that have played the majority of their history in La Liga, but do not have a major rival, mostly because Racing are the only fully professional team from Cantabria, so there isn't much competition between Racing and any other club from that area, with most others playing at the regionalised fourth level; only Gimnástica de Torrelavega have ever reached the second tier. However, Racing fans generally consider their biggest rivals to be the two major teams from the Basque Country, Real Sociedad and Athletic Bilbao, due to geographic proximity and the long history between these clubs. Bilbao is the closest city to Santander (approximately ), and the relationship between Racing and Athletic has been described in the past as 'the duel of the North', although the rivalry is dormant as Racing have not played in the top division since 2012.

There is also a minor rivalry between Racing and the two biggest clubs from neighboring Asturias: Real Oviedo and Sporting de Gijón.

Seasons

Recent seasons
{|class="wikitable"
|-bgcolor="#efefef"
! Season
!
! Pos.
! Pl.
! W
! D
! L
! GF
! GA
! Pts
!Copa del Rey
!Notes
|-
|1996–97
|1D
|align=right |13
|align=right|42||align=right|11||align=right|17||align=right|14
|align=right|52||align=right|54||align=right|50
|Quarter-finals
|
|-
|1997–98
|1D
|align=right |14
|align=right|38||align=right|12||align=right|9||align=right|17
|align=right|46||align=right|55||align=right|45
|3rd round
|
|-
|1998–99
|1D
|align=right |15
|align=right|38||align=right|10||align=right|12||align=right|16
|align=right|41||align=right|53||align=right|42
|Quarter-finals
|
|-
|1999–2000
|1D
|align=right |15
|align=right|38||align=right|10||align=right|16||align=right|12
|align=right|52||align=right|50||align=right|46
|2nd round
|
|-
|2000–01
|1D
|align=right |19
|align=right|38||align=right|10||align=right|9||align=right|19
|align=right|48||align=right|62||align=right|39
|Quarterfinals
|bgcolor=pink|Relegated
|-
|2001–02
|2D
|align=right |2
|align=right|42||align=right|19||align=right|14||align=right|9
|align=right|58||align=right|37||align=right|71
|Round of 64
|bgcolor=lightgreen|Promoted
|-
|2002–03
|1D
|align=right |16
|align=right|38||align=right|13||align=right|5||align=right|20
|align=right|54||align=right|64||align=right|44
|1st round
|
|-
|2003–04
|1D
|align=right |17
|align=right|38||align=right|11||align=right|10||align=right|17
|align=right|48||align=right|63||align=right|43
|3rd round
|
|-
|2004–05
|1D
|align=right |16
|align=right|38||align=right|12||align=right|8||align=right|18
|align=right|41||align=right|58||align=right|44
|3rd round
|
|-
|2005–06
|1D
|align=right |17
|align=right|38||align=right|9||align=right|13||align=right|16
|align=right|36||align=right|49||align=right|40
|3rd round
|
|-
|2006–07
|1D
|align=right |10
|align=right|38||align=right|12||align=right|14||align=right|12
|align=right|42||align=right|48||align=right|50
|2nd round
|
|-
|2007–08
|1D
|align=right |6
|align=right|38||align=right|17||align=right|9||align=right|12
|align=right|42||align=right|41||align=right|60
|Semi-finals
|
|-
|2008–09
|1D
|align=right |12
|align=right|38||align=right|12||align=right|10||align=right|16
|align=right|49||align=right|48||align=right|46
|Round of 16
|
|-
|2009–10
|1D
|align=right |16
|align=right|38||align=right|9||align=right|12||align=right|17
|align=right|42||align=right|59||align=right|39
|Semi-finals
|
|-
|2010–11
|1D
|align=right |12
|align=right|38||align=right|12||align=right|10||align=right|16
|align=right|41||align=right|56||align=right|46
|Round of 32
|
|-
|2011–12
|1D
|align=right |20
|align=right|38||align=right|4||align=right|15||align=right|19
|align=right|28||align=right|63||align=right|27
|Round of 16
|bgcolor=pink|Relegated
|-
|2012–13
|2D
|align=right |20
|align=right|42||align=right|12||align=right|10||align=right|20
|align=right|38||align=right|51||align=right|46
|3rd round
|bgcolor=pink|Relegated
|-
|2013–14
|3D
|align=right |1
|align=right|36||align=right|17||align=right|15||align=right|4
|align=right|55||align=right|27||align=right|66
|Quarterfinals
|bgcolor=lightgreen|Promoted
|-
|2014–15
|2D
|align=right |19
|align=right|42||align=right|12||align=right|8||align=right|22
|align=right|42||align=right|53||align=right|44
|DNP
|bgcolor=pink|Relegated
|-
|2015–16
|3D
|align=right |1
|align=right|38||align=right|21||align=right|11||align=right|6
|align=right|58||align=right|28||align=right|74
|1st round
|
|-
|2016–17
|3D
|align=right |2
|align=right|38||align=right|26||align=right|8||align=right|4
|align=right|86||align=right|28||align=right|86
|Round of 32
|
|-
|2017–18
|3D
|align=right |5
|align=right|38||align=right|20||align=right|8||align=right|10
|align=right|44||align=right|33||align=right|68
|1st round
|
|-
|2018–19
|3D
|align=right |1
|align=right|38||align=right|22||align=right|12||align=right|4
|align=right|66||align=right|25||align=right|78
|Round of 32
|bgcolor=lightgreen|Promoted
|-
|2019–20
|2D
|align=right |22
|align=right|42||align=right|5||align=right|18||align=right|19
|align=right|39||align=right|56||align=right|33
|1st round
|bgcolor=pink|Relegated
|-
|2020–21
|3D
|align=right |42
|align=right|26||align=right|12||align=right|6||align=right|8
|align=right|40||align=right|28||align=right|42
|1st round
|
|-
|2021–22
|3D
|align=right |1
|align=right|38||align=right|25||align=right|7||align=right|6
|align=right|61||align=right|31||align=right|82
|DNQ
|bgcolor=lightgreen|Promoted
|}

Season to season

44 seasons in La Liga
36 seasons in Segunda División
1 season in Primera División RFEF
7 seasons in Segunda División B
4 seasons in Tercera División

Honours
La Liga
 Runners-up: 1930–31

Segunda División
Winners (2): 1949–50, 1959–60
 Promoted (6): 1972–73, 1974–75, 1980–81, 1983–84, 1992–93, 2001–02

Tercera División/Segunda División B/Primera División RFEF
 Winners (3): 1943–44, 1947–48, 1969–70, 2021–22
 Group Winners (4): 1990–91, 2013–14, 2015–16, 2018–19
 Promoted (6): 1943–44, 1947–48, 1969–70, 1990–91, 2013–14, 2018–19

Cantabrian Championship
 Winners (13): 1922–23, 1923–24, 1924–25, 1925–26, 1926–27, 1927–28, 1928–29, 1929–30, 1930–31, 1932–33, 1933–34, 1938–39, 1939–40

European history
UEFA Europa League:

Current squad
.

Reserve team

Out on loan

Current technical staff

Notable former players
Note: this list includes players that have appeared in at least 100 league games and/or have reached international status.

World Cup players
The following players have been selected by their country in the World Cup Finals, while playing for Racing Santander.

  Mutiu Adepoju (1994)
  Mario Regueiro (2002)
  Mehdi Lacen (2010)

Former coaches

See also
Rayo Cantabria – Racing's reserve team
CDE Racing Féminas – affiliated women's team

References

External links

Official website 
Futbolme team profile 
BDFutbol team profile

 
Sport in Santander, Spain
Football clubs in Cantabria
Association football clubs established in 1913
Organisations based in Spain with royal patronage
1913 establishments in Spain
Segunda División clubs
La Liga clubs
Primera Federación clubs